Copaxa sapatoza is a species of moth in the family Saturniidae first described by John O. Westwood in 1854 as Saturnia sapatoza. It is found in the north-east of the Andean Cordillera in Colombia at high elevations.

The larvae feed on Alnus rhombifolia and Persea americana.

References

Moths described in 1854
Saturniinae